Wigan Warriors is an English professional rugby league club based in Wigan, Greater Manchester. Formed in 1872, the club was a founding member of the Northern Rugby Football Union in 1895, and competed in the inaugural season of the Northern Union's league championship. Since then, more than 1,100 players have appeared for the club's first team. Jim Sullivan has made the most career appearances for Wigan, having played 774 games between 1921 and 1946. Sullivan is also the club's all-time top goal scorer (2,317) and point scorer (4,883), and holds the club record for most points scored in a single match, with 44 against Flimby & Fothergill in 1925.

The try scoring record is held by Billy Boston, who touched down 478 times for the club. Martin Offiah and Shaun Edwards share the record for most tries scored in one game, with Offiah scoring ten tries against Leeds in 1992 before Edwards repeated the feat against Swinton later that year.

List of players
The following is a list of rugby league players who have made 100 or more appearances for Wigan since the formation of the Northern Union in 1895. Appearances include all official league and cup games, but exclude friendlies. The list is ordered by date of debut, then by surname and first name.

Historically notable players

The following subsections are lists of players who have played in a notable event whilst playing at Wigan RLFC, such as an international fixture, or else have performed exceptionally and have been recognised by club and its fans in light of these efforts.

Testimonials
Once players have been at a club for a certain length of time (usually ten years), they may be offered a friendly game celebrating their time at the club, known as a testimonial match. This is a list of players who have received testimonials from Wigan RLFC, in ascending chronological order with respect to when they received it.

 Brian McTigue (1960)
 David Bolton (1964)
 Colin Clarke (1973)
 Dennis Ramsdale (1985)
 Nicholas "Nicky" Kiss (1988)
 Shaun Edwards (OBE) (1993)
 Graeme West (1994)
 Mick Cassidy (2000)
 Andy Farrell (OBE) (2002)
 Denis Betts (2003)
 Terry O'Connor (2004)
 Kris Radlinski (MBE) (2006)
Sean O'Loughlin (2012)
Paul Prescott (2014)
Michael McIlorum (2017)

Team of the Decade
In 2005 during the tenth season of the current Super League championship format, the fans of Wigan RLFC voted for their best thirteen players of the 'Nighties' and the 'Naughties', called the Team of the Decade. This is a list of the ballot's resulting thirteen players.

Footnotes

References

 
Wigan Warriors players